The 1947 Shaw Bears football team was an American football team that represented Shaw University as a member of the Colored Intercollegiate Athletic Association (CIAA) during the 1947 college football season. In their second season under head coach Howard K. Wilson, the team compiled a 10–0 record (6–0 against CIAA opponents), won the CIAA championship, and outscored opponents by a total of 246 to 39.   

Key players included halfbacks Twillie Bellamy and Jim Jackson, fullback John Turner, end Bill Elliott, tackle Gladstone Booth, guard Leroy Way, and center Kermit Booker.

In post-season discussions about the black college football national championship, Shaw was criticized for a weak strength of schedule, having failed to schedule games against the three CIAA opponents that were ranked in the top 10 under the Dickinson Rating System: Hampton (No. 4), Virginia State (No. 7), and Morgan State (No. 9). In the final Dickinson ratings, Tennessee A&I was determined as the black college national champion with Shaw in fifth place. Florida A&M, a team that Shaw defeated by a 19–0 score, was ranked fourth under the Dickinson System. Shaw was, however, determined to be the CIAA champion under the Dickinson methodology.

Schedule

References

Shaw
Shaw Bears football seasons
Black college football national champions
College football undefeated seasons
Shaw Bears football